Kudavoor  is a village in Mangalapuram panchayat of Thiruvananthapuram Taluk in Thiruvananthapuram district in the state of Kerala, India.

Demographics
 India census, Kudavoor had a population of 10511 with 4890 males and 5621 females. The famous Kudavoor Mahadevar temple and Idayavanam Temple are situated in the center of the village.

References

 

Villages in Thiruvananthapuram district